Live is a 1992 live recording by Sarah McLachlan, not to be confused with the 2004 Live Acoustic EP. It documents a concert that McLachlan performed in September of that year in Harbourfront, Toronto, and was released on CD in October. All of the songs originally appeared on McLachlan's 1991 album Solace, except "Ben's Song", which is from her 1988 release Touch. Although labelled an EP, a format that usually has a short running time and only a few tracks, this release runs more than 30 minutes, above the length threshold of being a full album.

This album was released as a limited edition, which included a condensed version of McLachlan's 1991–1992 tour program; all copies released by the label have sold out. It is now considered a collector's item. It is the first of several live albums McLachlan has released to date.

Track listing

Musicians
Sarah McLachlan: Vocals, acoustic guitar, piano
Stephen Nikleva: Electric Guitar
Brian Minato: Bass
David Kershaw: Keyboards, Background Vocals
Kim Linekin: Keyboards, background vocals
Ashwin Sood: Drums, percussion, background vocals

References

1992 EPs
Live EPs
Sarah McLachlan live albums
1992 live albums
Nettwerk Records live albums
Nettwerk Records EPs
Sarah McLachlan EPs